The WABA Champions Cup 2001 was the 4th staging of the WABA Champions Cup, the basketball club tournament of West Asia Basketball Association. The tournament was held in Damascus, Syria between May 14 and May 18. The winner qualify for the 2001 ABC Champions Cup.

Standings

References
WABA Champions Cup - Roll of Honor 

2001
International basketball competitions hosted by Syria
2000–01 in Asian basketball
2000–01 in Jordanian basketball
2001 in Syrian sport